Wet-tail or proliferative ileitis, is a disease of hamsters. It is precipitated by stress. Even with treatment, the animal can die within 48–72 hours. Baby hamsters are much more likely to get the disease than older hamsters. It is commonly found when the hamster is being weaned at about four weeks of age.

Causes
Wet-tail is a disease in the animal's intestines caused by the bacteria, Lawsonia intracellularis. Wet-tail is a stress related illness—such stress can be caused by a variety of factors, including:

 Too much handling
 Change in environment
 Change in diet
 Extremely unclean caging
 Being away from mother and/or siblings
 Illness or death of a pair-bond or mate
 Improper caging

Symptoms
The symptoms may not appear for several days. The main symptom is the animal has a wet tail, matted with faeces. Other signs of the disease are:  
 Smell/ foul odor
 Diarrhea
 Lethargy
 Lack of appetite
 Excess sleeping
 Walking with a hunched back
 Unusual or staggered movement
 Folded ears
 Unusual temper (biting or nipping)

Treatment
Recovery is most likely if it is spotted within the first 24–48 hours, and veterinary advice should be sought. A vet may choose to give the animal drugs.

The sick animal should be kept in a cage by itself so that others do not catch the disease — wet tail can be very contagious so all objects the animal has come in contact with (wheel, food dish, huts, etc.) need to be sanitised.

If the animal doesn't want to eat, then dry, unflavored oats can be hand fed, which can also help with the diarrhea. The animal should only be fed dry foods, any foods with a high water content should be avoided.

If the animal has an unclean or matted rear-end, this should not be remedied using a bath in water — instead a q-tip (cotton bud) or cotton ball can be used to very gently clean the animal's rear end to avoid discomfort or rashes.

If the animal is not drinking, hydration can be aided by scruffing (i.e. very gently holding the rodent by the extra skin on the back of the neck) the animal so that they open their mouth; then in small, short intervals, water can be provided with a 1 ml syringe.  It is very important that this is done slowly, to avoid getting water down the animal's wind pipe. Unflavored pedialyte can be purchased from a grocery store and can be very helpful with wet tail.  If feeding is also an issue, a suggested aide is to feed extremely small amounts of no garlic, no onion, no added sugar mashed baby food, and administered using the same scruffing method, and again at a very slow pace.

References

Rodent diseases